Tapia (Spanish: Tapia de Casariego) is a municipality in the Autonomous Community of the Principality of Asturias, Spain. It is bordered on the north by the Cantabrian Sea, on the east by El Franco, on the south and west by Castropol.  Tapia is also the name of one of the parishes inside the municipality.  Its capital is Tapia.  The capital is 127 km from Oviedo, 122 km from Gijón, and 97 km from Lugo.

Geography 
The council is divided into parishes, formed in turn by places or neighborhoods (small groups of widely scattered houses) throughout the territory. This is due to land ownership typical in the Autonomous Community: smallholder highly fragmented into small parcels.
The terrain is gentle enough altitudes into the interior of the municipality are the most noteworthy pointing the Grandela (348 m) and the hill of Posadoiro (600 m).
The Council has diverse beaches among which are found, the Penarronda (shared with the council in Castropol), Santa Gadea, Serantes, Los Campos, Porcía (Shared with the council of El Franco).

History 

The council was established in 1863 when several parishes of the councils of Castropol (3) and El Franco (1) separated. The main driving force behind the creation of the new council was Fernando Fernández de Casariego, Marquis de Casariego. In recognition and appreciation, the Tapia council completed its name as 'Tapia de Casariego'.

In the 10th century the king Ramiro II, donate to the Bishop of Oviedo the territory between the Eo river and Navia and that is including the current council Tapia de Casariego. This grant is ratified by King Alfonso VII in the 12th century, which confirms that the territory Oviedo is the Obispalia in strong conflict with that of Lugo Salave retaining possessions and Villamil.

Economy 

Currently, the primary sector remains the greatest number of jobs generated, with just over 41% of the total. While agriculture, livestock and fisheries are in a slow decline in the tertiary sector.

The secondary sector is the least influence on the town, representing 18% of local jobs. The construction industry is one that generates more jobs, with some also representing the food industry and processing of metals.

The tertiary sector represents about 41% of the local economy, due to tourism in the area.

Population 
From: INE Archiv

Parishes
Mantaras
Campos y Salave
La Roda
Serantes

References

Official website of the Council of Tapia de Casariego
Asturian Federation of Councils 
Asturian Federation of Councils

External links

Official website of the council of Tapia de Casariego
Asturian Federation of Councils 
Guide to the West. Tapia de Casariego 

Municipalities in Asturias